Cordwood Point is a promontory of Cheboygan County that extends out into Lake Huron. The point has been subdivided into real estate for cabins and summer residences. U.S. Highway 23 serves the point and its small settlement.

The point's name reflects the need of pioneer steamboats to be fueled with cordwood.  Small steamboats would stop here at now-long-vanished wharves and fuel up.  Later technology moved the primary fuel supply of Lake Huron steamboats from wood to coal, and the cordwood trade dwindled and died.  When the county was organized into townships, Cordwood Point became part of Benton Township.

References
    

Landforms of Cheboygan County, Michigan 
Peninsulas of Michigan